Abdul Rehman (born 4 March 1929) is a Pakistani former sprinter. He competed in the men's 400 metres at the 1952 Summer Olympics.

References

External links
  

1929 births
Possibly living people
Athletes (track and field) at the 1952 Summer Olympics
Pakistani male sprinters
Olympic athletes of Pakistan
Place of birth missing (living people)